Hope & Faith is  an American  television sitcom, starring Faith Ford and Kelly Ripa as Hope Shanowski and Faith Fairfield. Hope is a homemaker and mother of three and Faith is her sister, a soap opera star whose character is killed off, leading her to move in with Hope and her family in the fictional suburban Cleveland town of Glen Falls, Ohio. It originally aired on ABC from September 26, 2003, to May 2, 2006. During its first and second seasons, the series was part of the revived TGIF comedy block.

Hope & Faith was created and produced by Joanna Johnson, who loosely based the premise on her own life as a former cast member of The Bold and the Beautiful. The series was primarily filmed at New York City's Silvercup East, a sister studio to Silvercup Studios. In May 2006, ABC announced that Hope & Faith had been cancelled after three seasons.

History
ABC announced on January 18, 2006, that it was benching Hope & Faith for the February sweeps to make room for an expanded edition of Dancing with the Stars. The show began to air its remaining episodes from March 21, 2006, on Tuesdays at 8:30 p.m. ET against American Idol. In May 2006, ABC announced that the show would be cancelled when it unveiled its fall 2006 line up.

Main Characters
 Hope Fairfield-Shanowski (Faith Ford). Hope is usually the most sensible one, and is always reluctant to go along with her sister's schemes. She is married to Charlie and has three kids, Sydney, Hayley, and Justin. She likes to bake and garden, and eventually has her own catering business;
 Faith Fairfield (Kelly Ripa). Faith is Hope's younger dim-witted celebrity sister. She was on Star Search, and starred as Ashley Storm (a character who had an evil twin named Angela) on the fictional soap opera The Sacred and the Sinful. Faith is lazy and makes Hope wait on her. She always hatches schemes and manages to involve her sister in them. She makes repeated attempts to get more acting work but is never successful. In season two, one of Faith's schemes involved her and Hope's creating a catering business: as a result, Faith ended up becoming professional caterer. She also claimed to have invented the idea of the internet, stating she "has the sketches."
 Charlie Shanowski (Ted McGinley; Josh Stamberg, unaired pilot). Charlie is Hope's husband and patriarch of the family. He dislikes Faith, and is always trying to get her to leave. He is an orthodontist. He likes watching sports and is a fan of Faith's former baseball playing boyfriend The Gooch;
 Sydney Shanowski (Nicole Paggi, season 1; Megan Fox, season 2–3; Brie Larson, unaired pilot). Sydney is Hope and Charlie's elder daughter. She particularly likes spending time with her aunt Faith, whom she sees as way cooler than her mother and gets sucked into Faith's schemes. She is portrayed as popular, vain, boy crazy, mean and kind of ditzy. Paggi's version was fairly wholesome but Fox's version was more promiscuous.
 Hayley Shanowski (Macey Cruthird). Hayley is Hope and Charlie's younger daughter. She is portrayed as the smart child who gets promoted to high school in season two. She is also caring and an animal activist. Sometimes she belittles her older sister because Hayley is smarter than her. She eventually becomes Edwin's girlfriend.
 Justin Shanowski (Paulie Litt; Jansen Panettiere, pilot episode only; Slade Pearce, unaired pilot). Justin is Hope and Charlie's only son. He is smart and is known to act like an adult with his mature interests (such as Frank Sinatra). He usually pals around with his dad and likes his aunt.

Recurring characters
 Jack Fairfield (Robert Wagner, Harve Presnell, unaired pilot). Jack is Hope and Faith's father and ever since his wife (Hope and Faith's mother) Mary Jo died, he has dated women half his age. The reason he married Hope and Faith's mother is because she was pregnant with Hope. He also had an affair with another woman when his marriage with Mary Jo was on the rocks and had an illegitimate son named Jay.
 Gary "The Gooch" Gucharez (Mark Consuelos). The Gooch is a baseball player, who was a former hot-shot major league baseball player who ruined his career by failing to catch a slow moving ball. Upon meeting, he and Faith bump heads, but the pair eventually have the hots for each other and start dating. Later on, the Gooch gets a job offer to play baseball in Japan and leaves their love behind. However, he moves back to the States in hopes of declaring his love for Faith and they eventually elope in the season three première. Although their marriage is short-lived, he comes back in a later episode and he and Faith re-unite.
 Edwin (Brett Murphy). Edwin plays Haley's boyfriend. He is portrayed as a smart nerd who has many allergies and asthma. He appeared in five episodes; "Hope Has No Faith", "Silent Night, Opening Night", "Mismatch", "Faith Scare-Field", and "The Gooch".
 Henry (Stark Sands). Edwin's older brother and someone who Sydney has a crush on. Like his brother, Henry is also smart.
 Mandi Ragner (Jenny McCarthy). Mandi has been Faith's best friend since they were in school. Mandi dates Hope and Faith's father Jack for one episode. She comes back in a later episode and tells their father that she is pregnant with his child. He planned to marry her, but when the baby was born it was obvious it wasn't his. She appeared in three episodes; "Jack's Back", "Natal Attraction", and "Stand By Your Mandi".
 Handsome Hal Halverson (Regis Philbin). Handsome Hal is a successful used car salesman. He uses celebrities and makes fools of them in his commercials. In his first episode he makes a fool out of Faith in his commercials. In his second episode he makes a fool out of the Gooch in his commercials. And in his final episode he loses his car dealership and becomes broke. Faith decides to be nice and invites him to stay with them. He has a scheme for the two of them to host a morning talk show. The producers love him, but they tell him to dump Faith. He appeared in one episode each season; "Car Commercial", "Another Car Commercial", and "Homeless Hal".
 Nancy Lombard (Susan Sullivan). Nancy is Faith's therapist. She helps Faith after Charlie and Hope force her to see Dr. Lombard. In one episode she tells Faith to do something fun, which she drags Hope into. She can also be very sensible towards Faith and usually tells her the right thing to do, but can cause some backfire for both Hope and Faith. She appeared in four episodes in Season 3 "Faith's Therapy", "Hope in the Middle", "The Restaurant", and "Old Faithful".
 Brooke Spencer (Rebecca Budig). Brooke is Faith's replacement on The Sacred and the Sinful. Many think that Brooke is a better fit as Ashley Storm, but some still think Faith is better. She has a disliking to Faith and always tries to out stage her. At the Daytime Emmy's, it is revealed that Brooke Spencer is a man and Jacqueline Karr is her mother, another famous soap star. She appears in four episodes in Season 1, which are, "Silent Night, Opening Night", "Trade Show", "Daytime Emmy's: Part 1", and Daytime Emmy's: Part 2".
 Jay (Johnny Galecki). Jack Fairfield had an affair with a lady, resulting in Jay. Therefore, Jay is Hope's and Faith's younger half brother. Galecki appears in 3 episodes. The name of the episodes are "Blood Is Thicker Than Daughter", "The Restaurant" and the episode "Jay Date".

Notable guest stars

Clint Black
Nick Lachey
Tony Curtis
Dean Cain
Robert Wagner
Cheryl Ladd
Regis Philbin
Kathie Lee Gifford
Jenny McCarthy
Carmen Electra
Jaclyn Smith
Ben Bailey
Mark Consuelos
Rue McClanahan
Carol Kane
Lynda Carter
Susan Lucci
Susan Flannery
Dominic Chianese
Tom Arnold
Peter Vack
Kevin Sorbo
Roger Clemens
Willie Randolph
Brian Austin Green
Dixie Carter
Hal Holbrook
Andrea Martin
Paul Shaffer
Wynonna Judd

Episodes

Reception

Critical reception
Hope & Faith received generally mixed reviews. On review aggregation website Rotten Tomatoes, the first season reports a 25% approval rating, based on 8 reviews. In a review for Variety, following the pilot episode, Phil Gallo criticised that it was predictable, commenting that the show is "Banal and derivative, ABC’s attempt to revive the TGIF franchise hinges on the concept that every generation needs its own Family Matters or Full House; this attempt to create a recipe based on the appeal of those shows backfires so badly." He continued, "Ripa and Ford are adequate, but the direction, writing and husband role are so lifeless, it would take some truly bizarre occurrences to make this at least unpredictable."

People Magazine gave the series a scathing review, and was highly critical of the pilot episode's humor , referring to it as a "terribly frantic half hour", and of Ripa, said that "this comedy would have more potential if Ripa’s over-the-top character were chewing up a soap-opera set rather than running amok in a Middle American kitchen.

In a favorable review from Ken Tucker for Entertainment Weekly, he praised the show's premise, and the performances of both Ford and Ripa, stating that the series is "Loud, obvious, and crass, Hope & Faith is one of this season’s more fascinating new sitcoms."

Ratings

Awards and nominations
{| class="wikitable"
|-
!Year
!Association
!Category
!Nominee
!Result
!Ref
|-
| 2004
| Angel Awards
| Best New Comedy
| Hope & Faith
| 
| 
|-
| 2004
| Young Artist Awards
| Best Performance in a TV Series(Comedy or Drama) - Young Actress Age Ten or Younger
| Macey Cruthird
| 
| 
|-
| 2004
| People's Choice Awards
| Favorite New Television Comedy Series
| Hope & Faith
| 
| 
|-
| 2004
| Television Week's Critics Poll 
| Worst Television (#8) 
| Hope & Faith| 
| 
|-
| 2005
| Primetime Emmy Awards
| Primetime Emmy Award for Outstanding Cinematography for a Multi-Camera Series
| Richard Quinlan
| 
| 
|-
| 2005
| Young Artist Awards
| Best Performance in a TV Series (Comedy or Drama) - Supporting Young Actress
| Megan Fox
| 
| 
|-
| 2006
| Angel Awards
| Best Comedy Series
| Hope & Faith| 
| 
|-
| 2006
| rowspan="3"|Young Artist Awards
| Best Family Television Series (Comedy)
| Hope & Faith| 
| 
|-
| 2006
| Best Performance in a TV series - Supporting Young Actress (Comedy)
| Macey Cruthird
| 
| 
|-
| 2006
| Best Performance in a TV series - Supporting Young Actor (Comedy)
| Paulie Litt
| 
| 
|}

Home media
On March 31, 2009, Lionsgate Home Entertainment (under license from ABC Studios) released Season 1 of Hope & Faith on DVD in Region 1. The set contains four discs and specials features include a blooper reel, audio commentaries, and cast and crew interviews. The second and third seasons have not yet been released.

Reruns and syndication
Shortly after the series was canceled, WE tv acquired the cable syndication rights to Hope & Faith and it debuted in August 2006, lasting through May 2010, in which it aired all 73 episodes. The series has also been screened on CMT and ABC Spark in Canada. In the United Kingdom the show was broadcast on the now defunct ABC1 from 2005, until the channel's closure in 2007, and in Ireland on RTÉ One and RTÉ Two, where it was aired in its entirety. In Australia, it was originally screened on Seven Network, and rerun on rival Network Ten's afternoon schedule. The show is also shown in Latin America, Fiji, New Zealand, Norway and Denmark.

Broadcast in other countries 
 : Hope and Faith on (STAR World)
 : Hope and Faith on (Comedy Central India)
 : Hope e Faith on (FOX Life), (Canale 5) and (Italia 1)
 : Ticēt un Cerēt on (LNT)
 : Hope and Faith on (TV2)
 : Hope and Faith on (International Oscar)
 : Hope and Faith on (FOX Life)
 : Hope and Faith on (TNT)
 : Королева экрана on (Disney Channel (Russia))
 : Hope and Faith on (FOX Life)
 : Сестри по неволя on (FOX Life)
 : La star de la famille on (M6)
  Kosovo: Hope and Faith on (FOX Life)

International versions
A Turkish adaptation of the series, titled Belalı Baldız'' (Troublesome Sister-in-law), aired in 2005 on ATV. Lead actors and actresses were Berna Laçin (Dilek; Hope), Nurgül Yeşilçay (Arzu; Faith) and Kenan Işık (Faruk; Charlie). Reruns began in July 2008 on TürkMax. All 34 episodes were made available on YouTube by the producer in 2018.

References

External links
 

2003 American television series debuts
2006 American television series endings
2000s American sitcoms
American Broadcasting Company original programming
English-language television shows
Television duos
Television series about sisters
Television series by ABC Studios
Television shows set in Ohio
TGIF (TV programming block)
Television series about families